The West Virginia Italian Heritage Festival takes place each year on Labor Day weekend in Clarksburg, West Virginia.  The festival was started in 1979 with each successive year, the little Festival has grown, and now is rated one of the "Top 100 Events in North America" including Canada and Mexico. Each year, this 3-day street festival brings over 100,000 visitors to Clarksburg.

History
The West Virginia Italian Heritage Festival began in 1979 as a celebration of the Italian-American heritage of a large percentage of the population in north-central West Virginia.  In its first year the festival saw great success and over 80,000 visitors.  That year, the parade included baseball Hall of Famer Joe DiMaggio as marshal, who shared his car with then Governor Rockefeller and Senator Jennings Randolph.  The main event of that first festival was a free Jerry Vale concert.

The COVID-19 pandemic caused many outdoor events to be cancelled in 2020, though only some will be virtual.

Festival
The festival takes place in downtown Clarksburg, each Labor Day weekend. The street blocks in which the festival take place are totally closed to traffic for the weekend. The atmosphere the festival creates is full of pageantry, entertainment, music, and of course a wide array of food and drink.  From the opening ceremonies, when the royal court of Regina Maria (Regina meaning "Queen" and Maria the name of the first queen of Italy), is crowned, to its conclusion with the traditional festival ball the festival is filled with great events including the annual 5k run, WVIHF Golf Tournament, and the annual pasta cook-off.

Honors and awards
Each year the Festival pays special tribute to outstanding Americans by making public awards and recognitions. Recipients of these awards have included the following individuals.

Outstanding West Virginia Italian-American Award
1980 Nicholas T. Camicia
1981 Dr. Jay Arena
1982 Leo Vecellio
1983 Capt. Tom Paul Scott, USN
1984 Dr. K. Alvin Merendino
1985 Robert DeProspero
1986 Lt. Gen. Leonard H. Perroots
1987 Michael C. Paterno
1988 Joseph Antonini
1989 Rear Admiral Thomas Lopez
1990 Larry Ciccarelli
1991 Brig. Gen. Tom Mancinelli
1992 Dr. Thomas Mazzocco
1993 Angelo S. Petitto
1994 Augustine A. Mazzei, Jr.
1995 Joseph L. Tropea
1996 Frank A. Oliverio
1997 Larry Argiro
1998 Joseph F. Fuscaldo
1999 Andrew J. Paterno
2000 Lucius Cavallero
2001 Victor Basile
2002 Father Hilarion Cann
2003 A. James Manchin
2004 Russell Bonasso & Samuel Bonasso
2005 Carmine J. Cann
2006 Joseph M. Minard
2007 Leonard J. "Joe" Trupo & Louis J. "Zeke" Trupo

Honorary Italian-American Award

1979 Senator Jennings Randolph, John D. Rockefeller, IV
1991 Thomas C. Burns
1980 James Compton
1981 Odus Kincaid
1982 Msgr. Benjamin Farrell
1983 Frank Maxwell
1984 Gov. John D. Rockefeller
1985 Gov. Arch A. Moore, Jr.
1986 US Senator Robert Byrd
1987 John Williams
1988 Jon A. McBride
1989 Gov. Gaston Caperton
1990 Msgr. John O"Reilly
1991 Thomas C. Burns
1992 Sam Huff
1993 Milan Puskar
1994 Judge Callie I. Tsapis
1995 Robert L. Reynolds
1996 Father Charles McCallister
1997 Governor Cecil H. Underwood
1998 Ed Pastilong
1999 Bishop Bernard W. Schmitt
2000 Leland Byrd
2001 Daniel McCarthy, Circuit Judge (Ret.)
2002 Governor Bob Wise
2003 I.L. "Ike" Morris
2004 Alan Mollohan
2005 Dr. Kelley Nelson
2006 James. C. Hunt
2007 Harry Green, Jr.

References

Clarksburg, West Virginia
Tourist attractions in Harrison County, West Virginia
Festivals in West Virginia
Italian-American culture in West Virginia